Judy Holliday (born Judith Tuvim, June 21, 1921 – June 7, 1965) was an American actress, comedian and singer.

She began her career as part of a nightclub act before working in Broadway plays and musicals. Her success as Billie Dawn in the 1946 stage production of Born Yesterday led to her being cast in the 1950 film version for which she won an Academy Award for Best Actress and a Golden Globe Award for Best Actress – Motion Picture Musical or Comedy. She was known for her performance on Broadway in the musical Bells Are Ringing, winning a Tony Award for Best Performance by a Leading Actress in a Musical and reprising her role in the 1960 film adaptation.

In 1952, Holliday was called to testify before the Senate Internal Security Subcommittee to answer claims she was associated with communism.

Early life
Holliday was born Judith Tuvim (she took her stage name from yom tovim, which is Hebrew for "holidays") in New York City, the only child of Abe and Helen (née Gollomb) Tuvim. Her father was executive director of the foundation for the Jewish National Fund of America (1951–1958), and a political activist who ran unsuccessfully six times between 1919 and 1938 as the Socialist Party candidate for the New York state Legislature. Her mother taught piano. Both were of Russian-Jewish descent. Judith grew up in Sunnyside, Queens, New York, and graduated from Julia Richman High School in Manhattan. Her first job was as an assistant switchboard operator at the Mercury Theatre, which was administered by Orson Welles and John Houseman.

Early career
Holliday began her show business career in 1938 as part of a nightclub act called The Revuers, whose other members were Betty Comden, Adolph Green, Alvin Hammer, John Frank and Esther Cohen. They played engagements in New York night clubs including the Village Vanguard, Spivy's Roof, the Blue Angel, and the Rainbow Room, and the Trocadero in Hollywood, California. Leonard Bernstein, a friend of the group who shared an apartment with Green, occasionally provided piano accompaniment for their performances. In 1940, The Revuers released a 78-rpm album entitled Night Life in New York. The troupe filmed a scene for the 1944 Carmen Miranda movie Greenwich Village. Although the Revuers' performance was cut, Holliday was an unbilled extra in another scene. The group disbanded in early 1944. Holliday remembered her years in the Revuers as unpleasant, saying she was initially a bad actress and so shy that she vomited between shows. She found it difficult to perform on stage in smoke-filled rooms while patrons over-imbibed, heckled and fought with each other, but deemed entertainers successful if they persevered in such atmospheres.

In her first film role, Holliday played an airman's wife in Twentieth Century Fox’s version of the U.S. Army Air Forces' play Winged Victory (1944). She made her Broadway debut on March 20, 1945, at the Belasco Theatre in Kiss Them for Me, and was one of the recipients that year of the Clarence Derwent Award for Most Promising Female Actress.

In 1946, she returned to Broadway as the scatterbrained Billie Dawn in Born Yesterday. Author Garson Kanin wrote the play for Jean Arthur; but when Arthur left New York for personal reasons, Kanin selected Holliday, two decades Arthur's junior, as her replacement. When Columbia bought the rights to adapt Born Yesterday to film, studio boss Harry Cohn wouldn't consider casting the Hollywood unknown. Kanin, along with George Cukor, Spencer Tracy, and Katharine Hepburn conspired to promote Holliday by offering her a key part in the Tracy-Hepburn film Adam's Rib (1949).

She received rave reviews for her performance in Born Yesterday on Broadway, and Cohn offered her the chance to repeat her role for the film version, but only after a screen test (which at first was used only as a "benchmark against which to evaluate" other actresses being considered for the role). She subsequently won the first Golden Globe Award for Best Actress – Motion Picture Musical or Comedy; and at the 23rd Academy Awards, won the Academy Award for Best Actress, defeating Gloria Swanson, nominated for Sunset Boulevard; Eleanor Parker, for Caged; and Bette Davis and Anne Baxter, both for All About Eve.

She starred opposite newcomer Jack Lemmon in his first two feature films, the comedies It Should Happen to You and Phffft! (both 1954).

Film historian Bernard Dick summed up Holliday's acting: "Perhaps the most important aspect of the Judy Holliday persona, both in variations of Billie Dawn and in her roles as housewife, is her vulnerability...her ability to shift her mood quickly from comic to serious is one of her greatest technical gifts." Director George Cukor also observed that Holliday had "that depth of emotion, that unexpectedly touching emotion, that thing which would unexpectedly touch your heart."

Investigated for Communist sympathies
In 1950, Holliday's name appeared on a list of 151 "pro-Communist" artists in the conservative publication Red Channels: The Report of Communist Influence in Radio and TV. The next year, she was subpoenaed by Senator Pat McCarran's Senate Internal Security Subcommittee, which was investigating subversion and Communist activity in the entertainment industry. Holliday was one of several actors accused of fundraising for Communist front organizations. She appeared before the committee on March 26, 1952, with Simon H. Rifkind as her legal counsel.

Holliday was advised to play dumb, as in her film portrayal of Billie Dawn, and she did – often to comedic effect. She denounced Stalinism and authoritarianism generally, but defended the free speech rights of those who espoused such views. Holliday later wrote of the experience to her friend Heywood Hale Broun: "Woodie, maybe you're ashamed of me, because I played Billie Dawn ... But I'm not ashamed of myself, because I didn't name names. That much I preserved." The investigation "did not reveal positive evidence of any membership in the Communist Party". The investigation concluded after three months and, unlike others whose careers were severely damaged by communist allegations, her career was relatively untarnished.

Later career
She starred in the film version of The Solid Gold Cadillac, which was released in August 1956. In November 1956, Holliday returned to Broadway starring in the musical Bells Are Ringing with book and lyrics by her Revuers friends, Betty Comden and Adolph Green, and directed by Jerome Robbins. In 1957, she won the Tony Award for Best Leading Actress in a Musical. Of her performance in the stage musical Brooks Atkinson wrote in The New York Times:
Nothing has happened to the shrill little moll whom the town loved in Born Yesterday. The squeaky voice, the embarrassed giggle, the brassy naivete, the dimples, the teeter-totter walk fortunately remain unimpaired ... Miss Holliday now adds a trunk-full of song-and-dance routines...Without losing any of that doll-like personality, she is now singing music by Jule Styne and dancing numbers composed by Jerome Robbins and Bob Fosse. She has gusto enough to triumph in every kind of music hall antic.

Returning to her film career after a gap of several years, she starred in the film version of Bells Are Ringing (1960), her last film.

In October 1960, Holliday started out-of-town tryouts on the play Laurette based on the life of Laurette Taylor. The show was directed by José Quintero with background music by Elmer Bernstein and produced by Alan Pakula. When Holliday became ill and had to leave the show, it closed in Philadelphia without opening on Broadway.

She had surgery for a throat tumor shortly after leaving the production in October 1960. Her last role was in the stage musical Hot Spot, co-starring newcomers such as Joseph Campanella and Mary Louise Wilson, which closed after 43 performances on May 25, 1963.

Personal life and death

In 1948, Holliday married clarinetist David Oppenheim, who was later a classical music and television producer and academic. (Mutual friend Leonard Bernstein had written Oppenheim five years earlier, in the context of Bernstein's own struggles with his sexuality, that he had thought of marrying Holliday as a beard.) The couple had one child, Jonathan, before they divorced in 1957. In the late 1950s, Holliday had a long-term relationship with jazz musician Gerry Mulligan.

Holliday supported Henry Wallace in the 1948 presidential election and Adlai Stevenson during the 1952 presidential election.

In 1960, she was awarded a star on the Hollywood Walk of Fame at 6901 Hollywood Boulevard in Los Angeles.

Holliday died on June 7, 1965, at Manhattan's Mount Sinai Hospital from metastatic breast cancer, two weeks before her 44th birthday. She was interred in the Westchester Hills Cemetery in Hastings-on-Hudson, New York.

Filmography

Radio appearances

Stage

Discography
Holliday recorded two studio albums (not including her film and Broadway soundtracks) during her lifetime.

Trouble Is a Man (1958)
Holliday with Mulligan (DRG, 1961 [1980]) with Gerry Mulligan

References

External links
 
 
 

1921 births
1965 deaths
20th Century Studios contract players
American film actresses
Jewish American female comedians
American musical theatre actresses
American stage actresses
Burials at Westchester Hills Cemetery
Best Actress Academy Award winners
Best Musical or Comedy Actress Golden Globe (film) winners
Deaths from cancer in New York (state)
Clarence Derwent Award winners
Deaths from breast cancer
Donaldson Award winners
Jewish American actresses
Columbia Pictures contract players
Metro-Goldwyn-Mayer contract players
American people of Russian-Jewish descent
Actresses from New York City
Tony Award winners
Actresses from the Golden Age of Hollywood
Jewish American comedians
20th-century American actresses
People from Sunnyside, Queens
Hollywood blacklist
New York (state) Democrats
California Democrats
20th-century American comedians
Julia Richman Education Complex alumni